The Olympic Games have been broadcast on television since the 1936 Summer Olympics.

1930s

1936 Summer Olympics
The 1936 games, held in Berlin, Germany, were televised by means of closed circuit television to various viewing halls. Broadcasts of the Games were made available in more than two dozen halls in Berlin, Leipzig and Potsdam and the Olympic village.

1940s

1948 Summer Olympics
The BBC provided coverage of the 1948 Summer Olympics on their television service, live from Wembley Stadium and the Empire Pool. Coverage was mainly limited to the London area, but could be picked up as far away as the Channel Islands in certain conditions.

1950s

1956 Summer Olympics

Television service was introduced to Australia in time for the 1956 Games in Melbourne. International broadcasting institutions present were BBC, CBS, NBC, Eurovision and United Press. These Games were the first time broadcasting rights were sold.

1956 Winter Games
RAI introduced the first Winter Games coverage ever, and the first Olympic one extended to an international audience. The broadcasts were relayed live via Eurovision to Austria, Belgium, Denmark, France, West Germany, Luxembourg, the Netherlands, the United Kingdom and Switzerland.

1960s
In England, Scotland, Wales and Northern Ireland, ITV covered the Summer Olympic Games in 1968, 1972, 1976 and 1980 in addition to the BBC. An industrial dispute prevented coverage of the 1984 Los Angeles Olympics but the Games returned to ITV screens in 1988, sharing the coverage with Channel 4 - Channel 4 showing the overnight and breakfast coverage with ITV covering the daytime action as well as broadcasting early evening highlights programmes. The 1988 Olympics were the last time that the Games have been shown on ITV with subsequent Olympic Games being shown only on the BBC. ITV only broadcast the Winter Olympics in 1968.

1960 Winter Games
CBS paid $50,000 for the right to broadcast the games in the United States, and this marked the first time the Olympic Games were televised there. Also, officials, unsure if a skier had missed a gate in the men's slalom, asked CBS if they could review a videotape of the race. This would be the impetus and inspiration for CBS to develop what would come to be known as "instant replay."

1960 Summer Olympics
CBS paid $394,000 ($ in ) for the exclusive right to broadcast the Games in the United States.  This was the first Summer Olympic games to be telecast in North America.  In addition to CBS in the United States, the Olympics were telecast for the first time in Canada (on CBC Television) and in Mexico (through the networks of Telesistema Mexicano). Since television broadcast satellites were still two years into the future, CBS, CBC, and Televisa shot and edited videotapes in Rome, fed the tapes to Paris where they were re-recorded onto other tapes, which were then loaded onto jet planes to North America. Planes carrying the tapes landed at Idlewild Airport in New York City, where mobile units fed the tapes to CBS, to Toronto for the CBC, and to Mexico City for Televisa. Despite this arrangement, many daytime events were broadcast in North America, especially on CBS and CBC, the same day they took place.

1964 Summer Olympics
The Tokyo 1964 games were the first to be telecast internationally. The games were telecast to the United States using Syncom 3, the first geostationary communication satellite, and from there to Europe using Relay 1, an older satellite which allowed only 15–20 minutes of broadcast during each of its orbits. Total broadcast time of programs delivered via satellite was 5 hours 41 minutes in the United States, 12 hours 27 minutes in Europe, and 14 hours 18 minutes in Canada. Pictures were received via satellite in the United States, Canada, and 21 countries in Europe. Several broadcasters recorded some sports from Japan and flown over to their countries.

TRANSPAC-1, the first trans-Pacific communications cable from Japan to Hawaii was also finished in June 1964 in time for these games. Before this, most communications from Japan to other countries were via shortwave.

1968 Winter Games
Frenchman Jean-Claude Killy won three gold medals in all the alpine skiing events. In women's figure skating, Peggy Fleming won the only United States gold medal. The games have been credited with making the Winter Olympics more popular in the United States, not least of which because of ABC's extensive coverage of Fleming and Killy, who became overnight sensations among teenage girls.

1970s

1972 Summer Olympics

Munich massacre

Initial news reports, published all over the world, indicated that all the hostages were alive, and that all the terrorists had been killed. Only later did a representative for the International Olympic Committee (IOC) suggest that "initial reports were overly optimistic." Jim McKay, who was covering the Olympics that year for ABC, had taken on the job of reporting the events as Roone Arledge fed them into his earpiece. At 3:24 A.M. (German Time), McKay received the official confirmation:

1980s

1980 Winter Games

Miracle on Ice

The rest of the United States (except those who watched the game live on Canadian television) would have to wait to see the game, as ABC decided to broadcast the late-afternoon game on tape delay in prime time.

Though the game was on live television in the Soviet Union, it was played at 1:00 AM Moscow time. This afforded CPSU officials some ability to squelch news and discussion; Pravda did not carry a game report or mention the match in its post-Olympic wrap-up, and the hockey players were quickly and quietly herded away from the arrival reception for Olympic athletes at Moscow's airport.

1980 Summer Olympics
Major broadcasters of the games were USSR State TV and Radio (1,370 accreditation cards), Eurovision (31 countries, 818 cards) and Intervision (11 countries, 342 cards). Asahi TV with 68 cards provided coverage for Japan, while OTI representing the Spanish-speaking world received 59 cards, TVNZ (New Zealand) was aired live and the Channel Seven provided coverage for Australia (48 cards). NBC, which had intended to be another major broadcaster, canceled its coverage in response to the U.S. boycott of the 1980 Summer Olympics, and became a minor broadcaster with 56 accreditation cards, although the network did air highlights and recaps of the games on a regular basis. The Canadian Broadcasting Corporation almost canceled their plans for coverage after Canada took part in the boycott and was represented by 9 cards.

The television centre used 20 TV channels. Montreal had used 16, Munich 12, Mexico City 7.

1984 Summer Olympics
The price for ABC's 180 hours of television was $225 million. All Los Angeles radio and television stations covered the Olympics extensively throughout the event. The Summer broadcast rights almost tripled from 1980 to 1984 ($87 million to $225 million) and both Winter and Summer rights have gone for $300 million or more since 1988.

1988 Winter Olympics

The American host network, ABC, paid a then record  million, while the main host broadcaster, the Canadian CTV television network, won the domestic rights for  million. A further $90 million was raised by sponsorships and licenses.

1988 Summer Olympics
The games were covered by the following broadcasters:

 : Argentina Televisora Color, Canal 13, Canal 11
 : Network Ten
: TVB, UNITEL
 : Rede Globo, Rede Manchete, Rede CNT, SBT, TVE Brasil, Rede Record and Rede Bandeirantes
 : RTB Channel 5 and RTB Channel 8
 : CBC
 : TVN, UCTV
 : CCTV
 : Inravisión (Cadena Uno: RTI, PUNCH, Caracol, JES, RCN & Datos y Mensajes)
  : DFF
 : TF1
 : ATV and TVB
 : Magyar Televízió
 : Doordarshan
 : TVRI Jakarta
 : RTÉ
 : RAI
 : NHK
 : TDM
 : RTM TV1 and STMB TV3
 : Televisa
 : NPO
 : TVNZ
 : NRK
 : Stereo 33
 : PTV-4
 : TVP
 : RTP
 : WAPA-TV
 : TVR
 : SBC Channel 12
 : KBS and MBC
 : CT-USSR
 : TVE
 : SVT
  (as ): TTV, CTV and CTS
 : National Television Thailand
 : TRT
 : BBC
 : NBC
 : Venevision
 : ARD and ZDF

1990s

1992 Summer Olympics

The exploding costs of the Games sent networks looking for alternative strategies to ease the financial burden. In 1992, NBC made an attempt at utilizing pay-per-view subscriptions with the "Olympic Triplecast", which was organized in conjunction with Cablevision and intended to sell packages of commercial-free, extensive programming.

NBC, which had the broadcast rights to the games, partnered with Cablevision for the experiment, believing that people would pay between $95 to $170 to see events live that would normally be shown on tape delay on the network in prime time. By the time the games began, relatively few people had ordered the package, which featured Red, White and Blue channels on a special three-button remote control offered by some cable operators for free as a lure to sign up for the service.

The plan was a failure, mainly due to viewers' reluctance to pay to see some events when network coverage of others was free of charge. NBC and Cablevision would lose millions of dollars, with one estimate putting their losses at $100 million.

1994 Winter Games

When the construction of the Lysgårdsbakkene jumping hills started in 1992, the hills had to be moved some meters north so that the American broadcaster CBS could get the best pictures available from their pre-chosen location.  CBS became the largest source of revenue for the hosts.

1996 Summer Olympics

For Atlanta 1996, NBC bought the broadcasting rights for US$456 million. Other broadcasters included:

: Rede Globo, Rede Manchete, Rede Bandeirantes, Rede Record, SBT, CNT, TVE Brasil, ESPN Brasil, PSN Brasil
: CCTV
: TF1, FTV, Eurosport
: ARD, ZDF
: Doordarshan
: TVRI, RCTI, SCTV, Anteve and Indosiar
: RAI
: NHK
: PTV
: Public Russian Television, VGTRK Olympiade
: KBS, MBC, SBS
: BBC
: WXIA-TV 11 (NBC), MSNBC and CNBC

1998 Winter Games
The Nagano 1998 Games were covered by the following broadcasters:
: NHK, NTV, TBS, Fuji TV, TV Asahi, TV Tokyo
: MBC
: CBS, TNT
: BBC
: Seven Network
: CBC
: CCTV
: YLE
: ARD and ZDF
: RAI)
: NRK
: SVT
: NTU

2000s

2000 Summer Olympics

Most of the footage used by international broadcasters of the Opening and Closing Ceremony was directed out of SOBO (Sydney Olympic Broadcasting Organisation) by Australian director Peter Faiman.  In Sydney in 2000, there were over 16,000 broadcasters and journalists, and an estimated 3.8 billion viewers watched the games on television.

The games were covered by the following broadcasters:
: Seven Network
: RTÉ
: BBC
: NBC
: RTVE
: RTP
: SVT
: CBC and TSN
: NHK
: KBS
: ARD and ZDF
: France Télévisions (France 2 and France 3) and Canal +
: PTV
: Televisa and TV Azteca
: TVNZ
: Rede Globo, Rede Bandeirantes, ESPN Brasil and SporTV
: RAI
: NTU
: TVRI and RCTI
: VTV

Running up to the games an Australian comedy satire, The Games, was broadcast in Australia (it was also broadcast, at a later date, in New Zealand). It featured a spoof of the issues and events that the top-level organisers and bureaucrats suffered in the lead up to the games.

A poignant part of the media coverage happened in the Canadian broadcast. On 28 September, the CBC was airing the Olympics, when the network's chief correspondent, Peter Mansbridge, broke in to report the death of former prime minister Pierre Elliott Trudeau.

NBC presented over 400+ hours on their main and sister stations, CNBC and MSNBC. The downside of the American coverage was that it was presented on tape delay rather than live due to the 15-hour time difference. The lone exception was the gold medal game in Men's Basketball, which featured the U.S. defeating France 85–75. The game was televised live in primetime on Saturday, 30 September (EDT), which was the afternoon of Sunday, 1 October in Australia.

2002 Winter Games
An estimated 2.1 billion viewers from 160 countries watched over 13 billion viewing hours during the 2002 Winter Olympics. The average worldwide viewer watched 6 hr 15 min of coverage, while the viewers in the game's host county of the United States watched an average of 29 hours each. The Salt Lake Organizing Committee (SLOC) used the organization International Sports Broadcasting (ISB), who had over 400 cameras, to provide a live video feed of competitions and ceremonies. The various official broadcasting companies in the 160 different countries could then tap into the feed and air the programs live or on a taped delay in their respective markets.

2004 Summer Olympics
NBC Universal paid the IOC $793 million for U.S. broadcast rights, the most paid by any country. NBC made it possible for the network to broadcast over 1200 hours of coverage during the 2004 Summer Olympics, triple what was broadcast in the U.S. four years earlier. Between all the NBC Universal networks (NBC, CNBC, MSNBC, Bravo, USA Network and Telemundo) the games were on television 24 hours a day, seven days a week.

In their 2004 coverage, NBC and its sister networks presented live coverage throughout the morning and afternoon, while showing marquee events pre-taped in prime time.

For the first time, major broadcasters were allowed to serve video coverage of the Olympics over the Internet, provided that they restricted this service geographically, to protect broadcasting contracts in other areas. For instance, the BBC made their complete live coverage available to UK high-speed Internet customers for free.

NBC launched its own Olympic website, NBCOlympics.com. Focusing on the television coverage of the games, it did provide video clips, medal standings, live results. Its main purpose, however, was to provide a schedule of what sports were on the many stations of NBC Universal. The games were on TV 24 hours a day on one network or another.

2006 Winter Olympics
The 2006 Olympic Winter Games were broadcast worldwide by a number of television broadcasters:
An extensive list of official broadcasters is found at The Games on Television section of the Torino Games official site.
The BBC provided television and radio coverage of the winter Olympics in the UK - the TV coverage was presented mainly by Grandstand regulars such as Hazel Irvine and Clare Balding. Most of the coverage was shown on BBC Two, with some on BBC One, and there was also BBC Red Button for Freeview, Satellite and Cable (digital TV) viewers.  BBC also broadcast many events live on the webcast Freeview provides an extra two screens whereas all three interactive streams were available to UK users only on bbc.co.uk and Digital Satellite and Cable such as Sky Digital.
Eurosport also provided live coverage of events to viewers across the EU and Europe.
American Forces Network rebroadcast some of this coverage for military personnel serving outside the United States.
SportTV2 broadcast for the first time all days and all events in Brazil.
ČT4 Sport was introduced on the occasion of the Olympic Games in the Czech Republic.

About 40% of the television coverage of the 2002 Winter Olympics was in high definition.

Ratings and attendance
A number of events reported low spectator attendance despite having acceptable ticket sales. Preliminary competition and locally less popular sports failed to attract capacity crowd as expected. Organizers explained this was because blocks of seats were reserved or purchased by sponsors and partners who later did not show up at the events.

Several news organizations reported that many Americans were not interested in the Olympics as in years past. It has been suggested that reasons for this disinterest include the tape delayed coverage, which showed events in prime-time as much as 18 hours later in the West.

In Canada, CBC's coverage has also posted disappointing numbers, which were reduced as the Canadian men's hockey team was eliminated early in the competition. Primetime ratings reached only as high as #7 in the weekly ratings. However, ratings for live, afternoon coverage have attracted 300,000 more viewers than the taped, primetime coverage. Overall, only primetime coverage has suffered, dropping 45% from the 2002 Games, with the entire coverage being 52% ahead from 2002. Meanwhile, on TSN, the numbers for its live curling coverage (which aired as early as 3:00am EST) were between 300,000 and 500,000 viewers.

The Olympics' main threat in the USA was the 2006 season of American Idol. One night of interest was 23 February in which the first results show of the season went head to head with that night's coverage which included the Women's Free Skate in Figure Skating.

2008 Summer Olympics

These games were the first to be produced and broadcast entirely in high-definition television. In their bid for the Olympic games in 2001, Beijing confirmed to the Olympic evaluation commission "that there would be no restrictions on media reporting and movement of journalists up to and including the Olympic Games."

In Canada the public network CBC/Radio-Canada and cable networks TSN and RDS broadcast its final games before a private consortium involving CTV/Rogers/TQS takes over for the 2010 Winter Olympics, which will be happening within Canadian borders, in Vancouver.

In Australia the Seven Network broadcast its final games before the Nine Network and Pay-TV operator Foxtel took over from the 2010 Winter Olympics and beyond.

2010s

2010 Winter Games

Vancouver 2010 was broadcast worldwide by a number of television broadcasters. As rights for the 2010 games were packaged with those for the 2012 Summer Olympics, broadcasters were largely identical for both events. Broadcasters included:

: Nine Network and Foxtel
: Central Record de Comunicação had been awarded the broadcasting for only free to air television on Rede Record.
: Canada's Olympic Broadcast Media Consortium consists of CTV, V, TSN, RDS, RIS, Rogers Sportsnet, Omni Television, OLN, Rogers radio stations, as well as third-party broadcasters APTN and ATN, MuchMusic
: BBC
: Cable TV
: NHK
: Canal 22
: SKY TV and Prime
: Solar Sports
: SBS
: RTVE
: NBC Universal

2012 Summer Olympics

Continuing the IOC's commitment to providing over-the-air television coverage to as broad a worldwide audience as possible, 2012 Summer Olympics was scheduled to be broadcast by a number of regional broadcasters. Though reduced dramatically since 1980, the United States television rights currently owned by NBC still account for over half the rights revenue for the IOC. Many television broadcasters granted rights to the games have bureaux and studios in London, but since at least the 1996 Olympics in Atlanta, rights-holder operations are hosted in the dedicated International Broadcast Centre (IBC). London's IBC was planned to be within the London Olympics Media Centre inside the security cordon of the Olympic Park.

As rights for the 2012 games were packaged with those for the 2010 Winter Olympics, broadcasts would be largely identical for both events. Confirmed broadcasters included:
In the United Kingdom the BBC will be sole broadcaster of the games.
In Europe, members of the European Broadcasting Union (excluding RAI in Italy). In Italy, SKY has achieved rights, but was forced to sell 200 hours of the event to RAI due to compulsory free broadcast of the event.
In the United States, NBC. Some online webcasts will be available.
In Canada, a consortium of Bell Media and Rogers Media properties.
In South Korea, SBS has the rights to broadcast the games.
In Brazil, Central Record de Comunicação had been awarded the broadcasting for only free to air television rights on Record and Record News.
In Mexico, the two major national networks Televisa and TV Azteca will broadcast the games.
In Australia, the Nine Network in joint partnership with subscription television partner Foxtel will broadcast the games.

2014 Winter Olympics

On August 19, 2008, it was reported that ESPN and ABC, both owned by The Walt Disney Company, were interested in airing the 2014 Winter Olympics in Sochi, Russia. ESPN and ABC planned to carry more Olympic events live as opposed to the tape-delay format used by current rights-holder NBC.  NBC, FOX and a partnership between CBS and Turner Sports also participated in the bidding process for televising the Games in the United States. In 2011, NBC agreed to a $4.38 billion contract with the International Olympic Committee to broadcast the 2014, 2016, 2018, and 2020 Olympics, the most expensive television rights deal in Olympic history.

2016 Summer Olympics

On August 19, 2008, it was reported that ESPN and ABC, both owned by The Walt Disney Company, were interested in airing the 2016 Summer Olympics in Rio de Janeiro, Brazil.

In Brazil, Rede Globo and Band won the rights to broadcast the games, but they allowed the IOC to negotiate with others broadcasters about the free-to-air transmission. Rede Record purchased the rights for the free-to-air broadcasts. But, they have the exclusive rights for cable TV and internet.

In Europe, for the first time, the IOC rejected the offer from EBU to broadcast the 2014 & 2016 Olympics, so individual networks in Europe must contract for television rights.

SKY Italia had reached an agreement to broadcast 2014 & 2016 Olympics, but later, it sold the second one to RAI, holding only the first one.

In Canada, the Canadian Broadcasting Corporation were granted rights to the 2014 and 2016 games in July 2012 for an undisclosed sum.

In Australia, Network Ten achieved an agreement for 2014 Winter Games spending $20 million, while the 2016 Summer Olympics had been granted to Seven Network in a bundle with 2018 and 2020, for $150 million.

2018 Winter Olympics

Discovery Communications has been granted by IOC rights to 2018 in Europe, except Russia.

2020s

2020 Summer Olympics

Discovery Communications has been granted by IOC rights to 2018 and 2020 (except France and United Kingdom), 2022 and 2024 Olympics in Europe, except Russia.

2022 Winter Olympics

Future Olympics Games 
On May 7, 2014, the IOC granted NBC Universal rights to all Olympic Games from the 2022 Winter Olympics to the 2032 Summer Olympics. The agreement was valued at US$7.65 billion, and will last from 2021 to 2032. NBC, which has held the broadcast rights to both editions of the Olympics since 2000, now holds the rights in the United States until 2032. This is the most expensive deal in the history of the Olympics.

In January 2023, the IOC announced that a joint bid from the European Broadcasting Union (EBU) and Warner Bros. Discovery had been awarded rights for all Olympic Games from the 2026 Winter Olympics to the 2032 Summer Olympics. The joint bid between European free to air broadcasters and Warner Bros Discovery follows criticism of the 2015 deal to award European television rights to Discovery. Each EBU member will broadcast at least 200 hours of coverage of the Summer Olympics and at least 100 hours of the Winter Olympics, whereas Warner Bros. Discovery will have unlimited rights.

See also 
Olympics on United States television
ABC Olympic broadcasts
CBS Olympic broadcasts
NBC Olympic broadcasts
TNT Olympic broadcasts
Olympics on Australian television
Nine Network Olympic broadcasts
Seven Network Olympic broadcasts
Network Ten Olympic broadcasts
Olympics on British television
Olympics on Canadian television
Olympics on CTV
Olympics on CBC
Olympics on Chilean television
TVN
El 13
Olympics on Chinese television
CCTV-16
Olympics on German television
ARD
ZDF
Olympics on Japanese television
Japan Consortium
Olimpics on Mexican television
Televisa
TV Azteca
Olympics on Philippine television
People's Television Network

References

External links
Olympics on TV
The World Comes Together in Your Living Room: The Olympics on TV
OLYMPICS AND TELEVISION
Olympic Commentators by Event History
Olympic Broadcasting Services 
Logos of Olympic Broadcasters - Part 2: 1960s
Logos of Olympic Broadcasters - Part 3: 1970s
Logos of Olympic Broadcasters - Part 4: 1980s
Logos of Olympic Broadcasters - Part 5: 1990s
Logos of Olympic Broadcasters - Part 6: 2000s and Beyond